The 1992 Grand Prix de Tennis de Toulouse was a men's tennis tournament played on indoor carpet courts in Toulouse, France that was part of the World Series of the 1992 ATP Tour. It was the eleventh edition of the tournament and was held from 5 October until 11 October 1992. Second-seeded Guy Forget won the singles title.

Finals

Singles

 Guy Forget defeated  Petr Korda, 6–3, 6–2

Doubles

 Brad Pearce /  Byron Talbot defeated  Guy Forget /  Henri Leconte, 6–1, 3–6, 6–3

References

External links
 ITF tournament edition details

Grand Prix de Tennis de Toulouse
Grand Prix de Tennis de Toulouse
Grand Prix de Tennis de Toulouse
Grand Prix de Tennis de Toulouse